Eleanor Edwards Ledbetter (1870–1954) was a librarian at the Broadway Branch of the Cleveland Public Library during the Progressive Era and the Great Depression. She is considered one of the first librarians to advocate for multiculturalism instead of Americanism. Ledbetter also focused on providing multilingual materials to the immigrants who used her library. She served as chair of the American Library Association's Committee on Work with the Foreign Born. Ledbetter is also recognized for the work she did translating Czech folktales.

Works 
 The Slovaks of Cleveland: With Some General Information on the Race (1918) 
 The Czechs of Cleveland 
 The Polish Immigrant And His Reading 
 The Jugoslavs of Cleveland, with a Brief Sketch of Their Historical and Political Backgrounds

References

Further reading 
 Jones Jr, P.A. (2013). Cleveland’s Multicultural Librarian: Eleanor (Edwards) Ledbetter, 1870–1954. The Library Quarterly: Information, Community, Policy, 83(3), 249-270.
 Ledbetter, E., Johnston, E., & Gratiaa, J. (1922). WORK WITH THE FOREIGN BORN — ROUND TABLE. Bulletin of the American Library Association, 16(4), 366-374. Retrieved October 14, 2020, from http://www.jstor.org/stable/25686070
 Goodreads Author Page 

1870 births
1954 deaths
American librarians
American women librarians
People from Cleveland
20th-century American women writers
20th-century American writers